Sphingomonas aestuarii  is a Gram-negative and rod-shaped bacteria from the genus of Sphingomonas which has been isolated from tidal flat sediments in Yeosu in Korea.

References

Further reading

External links
Type strain of Sphingomonas aestuarii at BacDive -  the Bacterial Diversity Metadatabase

aestuarii
Bacteria described in 2009